Shiv Pandit (born 21 June 1984), known professionally as Shiv Panditt, is an Indian actor, model, emcee, radio jockey and television host. He is the brother of Gayatri Pandit, who has been an assistant director on the films Desi Boyz (2011), Boss (2013), Roy (2015), Shivaay (2016), Om The Battle Within (2021) and Arjun Pandit, an ex sports anchor on NDTV and STAR Sports. Shiv is also the co-owner of the Chandigarh Cubs cricket team in the Box Cricket League (B.C.L.) along with actress Anita Hassanandani.

Education
Panditt attended The Doon School in Dehradun, and then went to Hindu College, University of Delhi, for graduation.

Career

Films 
Shiv Panditt made his screen debut in 2011 with the critically and commercially successful Hindi film 'Shaitan' where he got noticed and was nominated for the Filmfare Award for Best Male Debut. He went on to debut as a lead actor in the Tamil film Leelai. The film opened to positive reviews, with Panditt's performance being well received by both critics & audience alike.

Television 
After having featured in several T.V. commercials for popular brands (Sprite, Airtel, Tide, Colgate, LG & Rotomac to name a few), Panditt landed the lead role in the Television Sitcom 'FIR' in 2006. Post his stint on the show, he was contracted as the host for the 1st edition of the Indian Premier League on Set MAX for the show 'Extraaa Innings T20' in 2008.

Personal life 
He married costume designer Ameira Punvani in a private ceremony in New Delhi on 18 April 2018.

Filmography

Feature films

Short films

Television

Web series

Music videos

Recognition 
Panditt was ranked 3rd in Times of India's (Itimes.com) 'Most Promising Newcomer' in 2011. In March 2018, he was invited as a guest speaker for the TEDx event held in NMIMS, Shirpur to speak about his journey as an actor.

References

External links 

  
 

1984 births
Living people
Male actors in Hindi cinema
Male actors in Tamil cinema
Indian male film actors
21st-century Indian male actors
Indian male television actors
Indian television presenters
The Doon School alumni
Hindu College, Delhi alumni